Akespe is a village in the Aral District, Kyzylorda Region, Kazakhstan.  It is part of the Kosaman Rural District (KATO code - 433246200). Population:  

In 1925 a large site containing numerous fossils of the Oligocene was discovered near Akespe by the Aral Sea shore.

Geography
The village is located by the Butakov Bay of the North Aral Sea, near the southern end of the Lesser Barsuki Desert.

References

Populated places in Kyzylorda Region
Aral Sea